The Apartments and Flats of Downtown Indianapolis Thematic Resources is a multiple property submission of apartments on the National Register of Historic Places in downtown Indianapolis, Indiana.  The area is roughly bounded by Interstate 65 and Fall Creek on the north, Interstate 65 and Interstate 70 on the east, Interstate 70 on the south, and Harding Street on the west.

History
The 36 properties included in the nomination are generally in the period from 1890 to 1930, when Indianapolis was experiencing its greatest economic growth.  The oldest property, the Sid-Mar, was built in 1887, while the youngest property, the Wyndham, was built in 1930.

The need for apartments in downtown Indianapolis came about as a result of the city's industrial development during the late 19th century, led by the railroad and automobile industries, as well as Eli Lilly and Company.  Banking, retail, and educational institutions grew during this time as well.  The growth in population in Indianapolis after 1880 was fueled mostly by rural people moving to the city, as opposed to foreign immigration.  The city was attractive to people who wanted educational, financial, and social advancement.  The apartments and flats built in the city were an affordable alternative for people who wanted to move to the city before marrying or having children.  Single women were needed in the workforce during World War I, so they found apartment dwelling acceptable. Young men moving from the countryside were moving away from living in boarding houses and choosing apartments.

Architecture
A 1904 ordinance by the Indianapolis City Council outlawed wood-frame construction within the downtown area.  All of these apartment buildings were built of brick, with some use of Indiana limestone used for ornamentation, lintels, and sills.  Most of the buildings are three stories high, except for a few that were considered "high-rises".  There is not a lot of differentiation between architectural styles.  Most of the buildings use Classical Revival design features with symmetric facades, pilasters, keystones, and dentil and modillion cornices.  Other architectural styles popular at the time, such as Gothic Revival and Second Empire are absent.  The Blacherne has a few elements of Richardsonian Romanesque design, while a few bay windows show influence of Queen Anne style architecture in the United States.  Tudor Revival architecture began its influence in the 1920s, with the Dartmouth and the Wyndham as examples.  The McKay, built in 1924, has Art Deco detailing.

Initially, an apartment was defined as a suite of two or three rooms without a kitchen.  These were popular with young men.  A flat was defined as five to seven rooms, including a kitchen and a dining room, and were attractive to young married couples as well as retired couples.  The distinction began to fade by the 1920s, and "apartment" became the label for any multi-unit rental properties.

Properties included in the nomination
There were 37 properties in the nomination. An additional eligible property, the Delmar, was demolished while the nomination was in progress. One of the 37 listed buildings, the St. Clair, was removed from the National Register in 1991. The Chardwick and the Harriett were removed in 2011 due to destruction.

References

See also
 National Register of Historic Places listings in Center Township, Marion County, Indiana

Apartment buildings in Indiana
Residential buildings in Indianapolis
Neoclassical architecture in Indiana
National Register of Historic Places Multiple Property Submissions
National Register of Historic Places in Indianapolis
Residential buildings on the National Register of Historic Places in Indiana
Apartment buildings on the National Register of Historic Places